Shange may refer to:

Shan'ge, genre of Chinese folk song
Lebogang Shange (born 1990), South African race walker
Ntozake Shange (1948–2018), American playwright and poet